Lars Jørgen Madsen (19 July 1871 – 1 April 1925) was a Danish sport shooter who competed in the early 20th century in rifle shooting. He participated in Shooting at the 1900 Summer Olympics in Paris and won a gold medal in the  Military Rifle standing. Twenty years later, he won another gold, in the Military Rifle Team event. He was one of only three Danish competitors to win five Olympic medals. He also competed at the 1908, 1912 and 1924 Summer Olympics.

References

External links
 

1871 births
1925 deaths
Danish male sport shooters
ISSF rifle shooters
Olympic gold medalists for Denmark
Olympic silver medalists for Denmark
Olympic bronze medalists for Denmark
Olympic shooters of Denmark
Shooters at the 1900 Summer Olympics
Shooters at the 1908 Summer Olympics
Shooters at the 1912 Summer Olympics
Shooters at the 1920 Summer Olympics
Shooters at the 1924 Summer Olympics
Olympic medalists in shooting
Medalists at the 1900 Summer Olympics
Medalists at the 1912 Summer Olympics
Medalists at the 1920 Summer Olympics
Sportspeople from Region Zealand
People from Vordingborg Municipality